George Chase Miller (born February 12, 1992) is an American soccer player.

Career

College and amateur
Miller played fours years of college soccer at George Mason University between 2009 and 2013, including a red-shirted year in 2011.

Miller also played with Premier Development League sides Bradenton Academics, in 2010, 2011 and 2012.

Professional
Miller signed with Swedish side Bodens BK in 2015. He returned to the United States in 2016, signing with United Soccer League side Rochester Rhinos on August 1, 2016.

References

1992 births
Living people
American soccer players
George Mason Patriots men's soccer players
IMG Academy Bradenton players
Bodens BK players
Rochester New York FC players
USL League Two players
USL Championship players
Soccer players from Pennsylvania
Expatriate footballers in Sweden
Association football defenders
People from Perry County, Pennsylvania
American expatriate soccer players
American expatriate sportspeople in Sweden